Pelly Mountain may refer to:

Pelly Peak, in British Columbia, Canada
Uvayuq, formerly Mount Pelly, in Nunavut, Canada
Pelly Mountains, in Yukon, Canada

See also
 Pelly (disambiguation)